Lakhnor is a village in Rewari Tehsil of  Rewari District of Haryana State, India. It is a part of Gurugram Division. It is located 4 km west to District headquarters . Its Pin code is 123401 and postal head office is Bhudpur, a nearby village.

Demographics 
As of the 2011 India census, Lakhnor had a population of 976 in 197 households. Males (513) constituted 52.56% of the population and females (463) 47.43%. Lakhnor had an average literacy (714) rate of 93.54%,way higher than the national average of 74%: male literacy (495) was 96.49%, and female literacy (418) was 90.28% of total literates (913). 9.22% of the population was under 6 years of age (90).

Few decades ago the most prevalent profession of villagers was Agriculture but the new generation is drifting away from it. Now the village is home to people belonging to a wide spectrum of professions.

Lakhnor has a government primary school and a private sr. sec. school.

References 

Villages in Rewari district